Church of the Holy Spirit is a Lutheran church and parish center in Wolfsburg, Germany. The building is a notable project of Finnish architect Alvar Aalto.

November 1958, Alvar Aalto was personally commissioned to design the church by then-pastor Erich Bammel; Aalto began designing the building the same year. The design was completed and construction started in 1961. The church opened the following year.

See also 
Stephanuskirche (Wolfsburg)
Alvar Aalto Cultural Centre

References 

Alvar Aalto buildings
Alvar Aalto churches
Buildings and structures in Wolfsburg
Churches completed in 1962